The 2007 Patriot League men's basketball tournament was played at Hart Center in Worcester, Massachusetts and Sojka Pavilion in Lewisburg, Pennsylvania after the conclusion of the 2006–07 regular season. Top seed Holy Cross defeated #2 seed , 74–66 in the championship game, to win its fifth Patriot League Tournament title. The Crusaders earned an automatic bid to the 2007 NCAA tournament as #13 seed in the West region.

Format
All eight league members participated in the tournament, with teams seeded according to regular season conference record.

Bracket

References

Tournament
Patriot League men's basketball tournament
Patriot League men's basketball tournament
Patriot League men's basketball tournament
Patriot League men's basketball tournament